Travis Denning (born December 1, 1992) is an American country music singer and songwriter signed to UMG Nashville's Mercury Nashville label. He has charted with the singles "David Ashley Parker from Powder Springs" and "After a Few", the latter of which has reached number one on the United States Country Airplay chart.

Musical career
Denning was born on December 1, 1992, in Warner Robins, Georgia. He began pursuing his musical interests after listening to music with his father as a teenager, and released his first independent single in 2012, "Ready for Tonight". After moving to Nashville, Tennessee, in 2014, he got a publishing deal with RED Creative Group, which led to him writing songs for Jason Aldean, Justin Moore, and Chase Rice among others. After promoting himself on social media, he began performing as opening acts for Moore, Rice, and Lanco. In 2018, he signed to Mercury Nashville and released the single "David Ashley Parker from Powder Springs", which has charted on Country Airplay.  In 2019, Denning released his second single, "After a Few", which became a top ten hit on the Country Airplay chart. In May 2020, "After a Few" set a Billboard record by spending 60 weeks on the Country Airplay chart, breaking the previous record of 59 weeks, which had been set by Jimmie Allen's single "Make Me Want To". The following month, it reached number one after 65 weeks on the chart, also setting a record for the slowest ascent to the top.

"David Ashley Parker from Powder Springs" is based on Denning's real-life experiences with identity document forgery when he was underaged, and David Ashley Parker is a real person whose identity Denning used to buy beer and cigarettes when he was not old enough to do so legally. Denning wrote the song with Jon Randall and Jessi Alexander. Denning also co-wrote Michael Ray's 2019 single "Her World or Mine".

Denning has released his first extended play, titled Beer's Better Cold, on May 15, 2020. "Where That Beer’s Been" was sent to radio as the second single off the EP in June 2020.

Personal life
In October 2021, Denning became engaged to Madison Montgomery, the daughter of fellow country singer John Michael Montgomery, after two and a half years of dating.

Discography

Extended plays

Singles

Music videos

References

External links

1992 births
American country singer-songwriters
American male singer-songwriters
Country musicians from Georgia (U.S. state)
Living people
Mercury Records artists
People from Warner Robins, Georgia
Musicians from Nashville, Tennessee
21st-century American singers
Country musicians from Tennessee
21st-century American male singers
Singer-songwriters from Georgia (U.S. state)
Singer-songwriters from Tennessee